The West One Bridging Index (WOBI) is a collection of data intended to measure the state of the UK bridging market. Bridging is in effect a short-term loan designed to help a borrower obtain immediate funding to begin a particular project. In most cases, this loan is repaid once a longer term financial solution is put in place. The UK bridging loan market is currently unregulated by the Financial Services Authority (FSA), and as a consequence the Government does not produce any official statistics on the bridging industry.

History 
The West One Bridging Index was launched in 2011 by West One Loans.

Index Source Material 
The West One Bridging Index is calculated and published every two months (six editions per year), and consists of gross and net lending figures, number of loans (calculated on a 3-month moving average), average loan sizes, 1st charge loan to value (LTV), monthly interest rate fluctuations, and market predictions. It uses West One Loans’ management data, as well as statistics published by the Association of Bridging Professionals (AOBP) and other leading UK bridging loan lenders.

References 
 Bridging market could hit £1.5bn by end of 2012 according to West One Bridging Index Mortgage Solutions November 2012
 The number of completed bridging loans fell 5% during the second quarter of the year, according to the West One Loans quarterly bridging index Mortgage Solutions August 2012
 The true size of the bridging market is analysed through the West One Bridging Index. Bridgingwatch - Rob Jupp - March 2012 Mortgage Strategy.
 Mortgage Solutions reporting August findings of the WOBI that gross bridging lending could top £2bn in 2013 Mortgage Solutions 23 August 2013
 Alternative loans outperform alternative equities, says West One report Financial Reporter 26 June 2013

External links 

Corporate finance
Personal finance
Finance in the United Kingdom